The 1965 Maryland Terrapins football team represented the University of Maryland in the 1965 NCAA University Division football season. In their seventh and final season under head coach Tom Nugent, the Terrapins compiled a 4–6 record (3–3 in conference), finished in a tie for fourth place in the Atlantic Coast Conference, and were outscored by their opponents 164 to 132. The team's statistical leaders included Phil Petry with 763 passing yards, Ernie Torain with 370 rushing yards, and Bobby Collins with 462 receiving yards.

Schedule

References

Maryland
Maryland Terrapins football seasons
Maryland Terrapins football